The 1872 United States presidential election in Virginia took place on November 5, 1872, as part of the 1872 United States presidential election. Voters chose 11 representatives, or electors to the Electoral College, who voted for president and vice president.

Virginia voted for the Republican candidate, incumbent President Ulysses S. Grant over the Democratic and Liberal Republican candidate, former U.S. Representative Horace Greeley. This was the first presidential election that Virginia participated in after the events of the U.S. Civil War, and also the first election where West Virginia wasn't a part of the state. It was also the first presidential election in which the state voted for a Republican candidate and would not occur again until 1928. The election was still very close in this state and Grant won Virginia by a margin of 0.98%.

Results

References

Virginia
1872
1872 Virginia elections